Charon is the brand name of a group of software products able to emulate several CPU architectures. The emulators available under this brand mostly cover the Digital Equipment DEC hardware platforms PDP-11, VAX, and AlphaServer, which support many of the legacy operating systems, including Tru64 and OpenVMS. The product range also includes virtualization solutions for HP 3000 using MPE/iX and SPARC. Charon software products have been developed by the Swiss software company Stromasys SA, which has its headquarters in Cointrin, near Geneva.

Products and technology 

DEC systems are used in production despite their sometimes significant age. Some companies use them to support applications that are considered mission critical, for example core applications in banks and stock exchanges, air traffic control systems, or manufacturing plants. The aging hardware and changing supplier availability are making the operation of such systems on the original hardware increasingly difficult. Porting the complete solution to new hardware, new operating system, and new programming language (including libraries and interfaces) is often expensive and associated with high risk. A migration to an emulated environment constitutes an alternative solution enabling the use of modern x86 hardware or virtualized standard x86 servers, without having to abandon the fully functioning operating system and the application environment.

The virtualization solutions being sold under the product names Charon-PDP, Charon-AXP, Charon-VAX, Charon-HPA and Charon-SSP consist of a combination of virtual machine and hardware abstraction layer. They run on Microsoft Windows, Linux or VMware ESXi and provide a virtual PDP-11, VAX, AlphaServer, HP 3000, and SPARC environment. In a first step, a configuration matching the old system is created on the host platform, thereby creating an emulated guest system behaving like the old physical server. In the second step, the operating system and – as required – associated applications and application data, are moved from the real hardware to the virtual machine. Depending on the operating system, the data is copied as physical image or file system backup. Such migrations are possible without source code changes or operating system upgrades.

Product Name 
Stromasys product name Charon is inspired by Greek mythology. In ancient Greece, Charon was the ferry man, whose task was to transport the dead across the river called Styx to Hades. The Stromasys emulator provides virtualization of the old DEC hardware allowing old operating systems such as OpenVMS to continue working without change. Figuratively speaking, CHARON "saves“ data and applications and makes them available for future use beyond the life of obsolete hardware.

Vendor 
After the take-over of Digital Equipment Corporation (DEC) by Compaq in 1998, which in turn was taken over by Hewlett-Packard in 2002, the former manager Robert Boers bought the DEC European Migration and Porting Center, from which the company Software Resources International was formed. In the beginning, the company offered services for migration projects. After having performed migration, porting, and VMS system programming projects for some time, the company recognized the need for PDP-11 emulators. The development of the first PDP-11 emulator was followed by the development of additional emulators for PDP-11, VAX, Alpha, HP 3000 and SPARC systems. 
In 2008 the company was renamed to Stromasys SA, now a public company under Swiss law. In December 2013, George Koukis acquired the company. Currently, the company has over 100 employees. The company, which was founded in 1998, is now led by John Prot as CEO and CTO.

References

Emulation software